Aghcheh Kohal-e Rajabanlu (also Romanized as Āghcheh Kohal-e Rajabānlū; also known as Āghjeh Kohal) is a village in Abbas-e Gharbi Rural District, Tekmeh Dash District, Bostanabad County, East Azerbaijan Province, Iran. At the 2006 census, its population was 334, in 63 families.

References 

Populated places in Bostanabad County